{|

{{Infobox ship career
| Hide header              = 
| Ship name                =* Venezia
 Hanjin Venezia (2010)
 MSC Venezia (2008)
 Hanjin Venezia (2008)
 Cosco Busan (2006)
 Hanjin Cairo (2001)
| Ship owner               = Regal Stone Ltd.
| Ship operator            = Synergy Management Ltd. 
| Ship registry            = 
| Ship route               = 
| Ship ordered             = 
| Ship builder             =*
Ulsan, South Korea
| Ship original cost       = 
| Ship yard number         = 1381
| Ship way number          = 
| Ship laid down           = 
| Ship launched            = 20 September 2001
| Ship completed           = December 2001
| Ship christened          = 
| Ship acquired            = 
| Ship maiden voyage       = 
| Ship in service          = 
| Ship out of service      = 
| Ship identification      =*Call sign: VRDI6
CGMIX ID: 512403

MMSI no.: 477968900
| Ship fate                = January 2017 scrapped in Chittagong
| Ship status              = 
| Ship notes               = <ref name=CGMIX >{{cite web  | title=Results for Vessel: MSC Venezia | url=http://cgmix.uscg.mil/PSIX/PSIXDetails.aspx?VesselID=512403 | work=CGMIX PSIX| publisher=United States Coast Guard | date=2010  | access-date=24 July 2010}}</ref>
}}

|}Hanjin Venezia, formerly named the Cosco Busan,''' is a   container ship. On 7 November 2007, it collided with the protective fender of the Delta Tower of the San Francisco–Oakland Bay Bridge in heavy fog. The collision sliced open two of its fuel tanks and led to the Cosco Busan oil spill in San Francisco Bay. She was renamed the Hanjin Venezia after the accident.

The vessel was initially built in 2001 by Hyundai Heavy Industries at Ulsan, South Korea. In December 2001, the vessel was placed under long-term charter to Hanjin Shipping Co., Ltd. of Seoul, South Korea and named Hanjin Cairo. The vessel called on various ports of Europe, Asia, and along the West Coast of the United States, specifically the Ports of Long Beach and Oakland, California.

In November 2006, the ship's owners renamed the vessel from the Hanjin Cairo to the Cosco Busan. After a 3-year absence from U.S. ports, the Cosco Busan called upon the Port of Long Beach on December 29, 2006. On October 24, 2007 the vessel was sold to Regal Stone Ltd. of Hong Kong and was re-flagged and sailed under the national flag of Hong Kong. The Cosco Busan's new owners contracted with Fleet Management to supply an all-Chinese crew and to manage her technical operations on behalf of the owners. Despite named after Cosco, Cosco claimed that the ship has no relation to the company.

Through the changes in flag, ownership, and managing operator, the vessel has remained under charter to Hanjin Shipping Company.

 References 

Further reading
 The COSCO Busan collision course towards the San Francisco–Oakland Bay Bridge
 Cosco Busan Natural Resource Damage Assessment

External links
 MSC Venezia (IMO #9231743) at the Shipping Database (subscription required)
 MSC Venezia (IMO 9231743) image gallery at Shipspotting.com''

2001 ships
Container ships
Hanjin Group
Maritime incidents in 2007
Ships built by Hyundai Heavy Industries Group